was a Japanese football player. He played for Japan national team.

Club career
Tatsuhara was born in Shinagawa, Tokyo on January 14, 1913. He played for Waseda WMW was consisted of his alma mater Waseda University players and graduates. At the club, he played with many Japan national team players Taizo Kawamoto, Tadao Horie, Yasuo Suzuki, Kunitaka Sueoka, Takashi Kano and so on. He won the 2nd place at 1940 Emperor's Cup. This tournament was the last Emperor's Cup before the war because Emperor's Cup was suspended for World War II from 1941 to 1945.

National team career

In May 1934, when Tatsuhara was a Waseda University student, he was selected Japan national team for 1934 Far Eastern Championship Games in Manila. At this competition, on May 13, he debuted against Dutch East Indies. In 1936, he was also selected Japan for 1936 Summer Olympics in Berlin. Japan completed a come-from-behind victory first game against Sweden. The first victory in Olympics for the Japan and the historic victory over one of the powerhouses became later known as "Miracle of Berlin" (ベルリンの奇跡) in Japan. In 2016, this team was selected Japan Football Hall of Fame. He played 4 games for Japan until 1936.

National team statistics

References

External links
 
 
 Japan National Football Team Database
Japan Football Hall of Fame (Japan team at 1936 Olympics) at Japan Football Association
 
 

1913 births
Year of death missing
Waseda University alumni
Association football people from Tokyo
Japanese footballers
Japan international footballers
Olympic footballers of Japan
Footballers at the 1936 Summer Olympics
Association football midfielders